is a Japanese infielder for the Yomiuri Giants in Japan's Nippon Professional Baseball.

External links

1978 births
Japanese baseball players
Living people
Saitama Seibu Lions players
Seibu Lions players
Baseball people from Saitama Prefecture
Yokohama BayStars players
Yomiuri Giants players
People from Kawaguchi, Saitama